Selby Station was opened in May 1904, and named after the local landowner and Shire President  W. Selby. The station consists of a short platform and corrugated iron waiting shelter. Trains do not normally stop here but will stop if required.

External links
 Melway map at street-directory.com.au

Tourist railway stations in Melbourne
Railway stations in the Shire of Yarra Ranges